is a Japanese voice actor and narrator represented by Ken Production. Some of his major roles include Toma Kamijo in the A Certain Magical Index / A Certain Scientific Railgun series, Kukai Soma in Shugo Chara, Moritaka Mashiro in Bakuman, Takashi Kosuda in B Gata H Kei, Koichi Sakakibara in Another, and Kokonotsu Shikada in Dagashi Kashi.

Filmography

Anime

Video games

Drama CDs

Overseas dubbing

References

External links
 Official agency profile 
 

1981 births
Living people
Japanese male musical theatre actors
Japanese male video game actors
Japanese male voice actors
Ken Production voice actors
Male voice actors from Tochigi Prefecture
21st-century Japanese male actors